The Shin Railway Viaduct (also known as the Invershin Viaduct or Oykel Viaduct) is a railway viaduct that crosses the Kyle of Sutherland.The viaduct carries the Far North Line between Inverness and Wick and Thurso. Invershin railway station is at the north-eastern end of the viaduct, while Culrain railway station is a short distance to the south.

History
It was built for the Sutherland Railway by engineers Joseph Mitchell and Murdoch Paterson.

The railway opened to traffic on 13 April 1868.

Design
It crosses the river with a single  span,  longer than that used at the Dalguise Viaduct by Mitchell four years earlier. The deck which carries the track sits on top of rather than between the truss girders. There are two semicircular stone arches in the approach viaduct to the south, and three to the north.

A footbridge was added to the northern side of the viaduct  in 2000. This is now part of National Cycle Network Route 1.

References

Category A listed buildings in Highland (council area)
Listed bridges in Scotland
Bridges in Highland (council area)
Buildings and structures in Sutherland
Bridges completed in 1868
1868 establishments in Scotland